Manoba sumatrana is a moth in the  family Nolidae. It was described by Walter Karl Johann Roepke in 1948. It is found on Sumatra.

References

Moths described in 1948
Nolinae